The White Ship (Italian: La nave bianca) is a 1941 Italian war film directed by Roberto Rossellini. Its cast was made up entirely of amateur actors, many of them the real crew of a hospital ship of the Italian navy. The production was a work of propaganda intended to support the war aims of the Fascist Italian regime during the Second World War. It was made with the close co-operation of the Italian Navy, particularly Francesco De Robertis. Vittorio Mussolini, the son of the Italian dictator, was also a supporter of the project.

It was the first feature film directed by Rossellini, and commenced what has been described as his "Fascist Trilogy" which also includes A Pilot Returns (1942) and The Man with a Cross (1943). Along with a number of other films of the era, it is considered a precursor to Italian neorealism. Rossellini went on to be a leading Italian filmmaker, and a major figure in the development of neorealism.

The film was screened at the 1941 Venice Film Festival, before going on general release the following year. Because of this 1941 and 1942 are both often cited as its release date. It was awarded the Cup of the National Fascist Party at Venice.

Synopsis
A young Italian sailor falls in love with a schoolteacher before returning to service on a warship. During the Battle of Cape Teulada against the Royal Navy, he is wounded and transferred to a hospital ship. There he is reunited with his lover, who is now working as a nurse.

References

Bibliography 
 Bondanella, Peter. The Films of Roberto Rossellini. Cambridge University Press, 1993.

External links 
 

1941 films
Italian war drama films
Italian black-and-white films
1940s war drama films
1940s Italian-language films
Films directed by Roberto Rossellini
Seafaring films
World War II films made in wartime
Films set in the Mediterranean Sea
1941 drama films
Films scored by Renzo Rossellini
Italian World War II films
1940s Italian films